Sir Charles Brooke, Rajah of Sarawak, GCMG (Charles Anthoni Johnson Brooke; 3 June 1829 – 17 May 1917), born Charles Anthoni Johnson, ruled as the head of state of Raj of Sarawak from 3 August 1868 until his death. He succeeded his uncle, James Brooke, as the second White Rajah of this small country on the coast of Borneo.

Biography
Charles Anthoni Johnson, was born in Berrow Vicarage, Burnham, Somerset, in England, to the Rev. Francis Charles and Emma Frances Johnson, née Brooke.  Emma was the younger sister of James Brooke, the first Rajah of Sarawak. In addition to Charles, Francis and Emma had other children: Captain John Brooke Johnson (1823–1868) (later  Brooke Brooke), Mary Anna Johnson (b. 1824), Harriet Helena Johnson (b. 1826), Charlotte Frances Johnson (b. 1828), Captain (William) Frederic Johnson (b. 1830), Emma Lucy Johnson (b. 1832),  Margaret Henrietta Johnson (1834–1845), Georgianna Brooke Johnson (1836–1854), James Stuart Johnson (1839–1840), and Henry Stuart Johnson (b. 1841).

Brooke was educated at Crewkerne Grammar School and entered the Royal Navy. He entered the service of his uncle James, the first Rajah of Sarawak, in 1852, took his name, and began as Resident at the Lundu station in the Raj of Sarawak. In the 1857 rebellion against the White Rajah James Brooke, Charles Brooke helped his uncle James put down the rebellion led by Liu Shan Bang with his force composed of Ibans and local Bidayuh tribes. It is noted that Brooke's Iban forces pursued the remaining rebels to Bau, where they slaughtered the 3,000 villagers including women, children and old folks in a massacre. In 1865, James named Charles as his successor.

Brooke married Margaret Alice Lili de Windt at Highworth, Wiltshire, on 28 October 1869; she was raised to the title of Ranee of Sarawak with the style of Her Highness on the same day. They had six children, three of whom survived infancy:
 Dayang Ghita Brooke (1870–1873)
 James Harry Brooke (1872–1873)
 Charles Clayton Brooke (1872–1873)
 Charles Vyner Brooke, Rajah of Sarawak (1874–1963)
 Bertram Willes Dayrell Brooke, Tuan Muda (1876–1965)
 Henry Keppel Brooke, Tuan Bongsu (1879–1926)

Brooke’s son Charles Vyner Brooke succeeded him as Rajah. He had another son, Esca Brooke (1867–1953), the result of a previous marriage  with a Malay woman known as Dayang Mastiah.  Esca was later adopted by the Rev. William Daykin, moved to Canada, and took the name Brooke-Daykin.

Brooke resigned his commission in the Royal Navy in 1861 and continued the work his uncle had started, suppressing piracy, slavery, and head-hunting, while encouraging trade and development and expanding the borders of his domain as the opportunity arose. In 1891 he established the Sarawak Museum, the first museum in Borneo. Brooke founded a boys' school in 1903, called the 'Government Lay School', where Malays could be taught in the Malay language. This was the forerunner of SMK Green Road. By the time of his death, Britain had established a protectorate over Sarawak, it had parliamentary government and a railway, and oil had been discovered.

All three White Rajahs are buried in St Leonard's Church in the village of Sheepstor on Dartmoor.

Honours
British Honours
 Knight Grand Cross of the Order of St Michael and St George (GCMG), 1888

At least two Bornean species were named in Brooke's honour:
 Brooke's Squirrel (Sundasciurus brookei), named by Oldfield Thomas
 Cervus brookei, a deer named  by Charles Hose in 1893

See also

 Fort Margherita
  Genealogy Johnson/Brooke

References

Further reading
 
 
 
 Dictionary of National Biography entry

1829 births
1917 deaths
Charles Anthoni Johnson Brooke
Knights Grand Cross of the Order of St Michael and St George
People from Burnham-on-Sea
19th-century monarchs in Asia
Southeast Asian monarchs
Burials in Devon